Cleberson is a name used by a number of Brazilian footballers. Notable people with the name include:

Cleberson Souza Santos (born 1978)
Cleberson Silva Andrade (born 1988)
Cleberson Luis Marques (born 1984)

See also
Cleverson (disambiguation), given name